Mitromorpha karpathensis is a species of sea snail, a marine gastropod mollusk in the family Mitromorphidae.

Description
The length of the shell varies between 4 mm and 8 mm.

Distribution
This marine species occurs in the Mediterranean Sea and off the Canary Islands.

References

 Nordsieck F. (1969). Die europäischen Meeresmuscheln. Vom Eismeer bis Kapverden, Mittelmeer und Schwarzes Meer. Gustav Fischer, Stuttgart XIII + 256 pp
 Mifsud C. (2001). The genus Mitromorpha Carpenter, 1865 (Neogastropoda, Turridae), and its sub-genera with notes on the European species. Published by the Author, Rabat, Malta 32 pp

External links
 Amati B., Smriglio C. & Oliverio M. (2015). Revision of the Recent Mediterranean species of Mitromorpha Carpenter, 1865 (Gastropoda, Conoidea, Mitromorphidae) with the description of seven new species. Zootaxa. 3931(2): 151–195
 
 

karpathensis
Gastropods described in 1969